

Stanley Flat is a locality in the Mid North region of South Australia about  north of Clare along the Horrocks Highway. It is where the Clare Racecourse is situated, as well as an institute hall.

Governance
Stanley Flat is governed at the local level by the Clare and Gilbert Valleys Council, located within the state electoral district of Frome and the federal electoral division of Grey.

See also
 Albert Fryar
 County of Stanley
 List of cities and towns in South Australia
 Stanley Football Association

References

External links
Manning Index of South Australian History
Clare Regional History Group

Towns in South Australia
Mid North (South Australia)